The Man in the White Suit is a 1951 British satirical science fiction comedy film made by Ealing Studios. It stars Alec Guinness, Joan Greenwood and Cecil Parker and was directed by Alexander Mackendrick. The film was nominated for an Academy Award for Best Writing (Screenplay) for Roger MacDougall, John Dighton and Alexander Mackendrick.

It followed a common Ealing Studios theme of the "common man" against the Establishment. In this instance the hero falls foul of both trade unions and the wealthy mill owners who attempt to suppress his invention.

Mandy Miller (aged only 6) made her first film appearance in this film.

Plot
Sidney Stratton, a brilliant young research chemist and former Cambridge scholarship recipient, has been dismissed from jobs at several textile mills in the north of England because of his demands for expensive facilities and his obsession with inventing an everlasting fibre. Whilst working as a labourer at the Birnley Mills, he accidentally becomes an unpaid researcher and invents an incredibly strong fibre which repels dirt and never wears out. From this fabric, a suit is made—which is brilliant white because it cannot absorb dye and slightly luminous because it includes radioactive elements.

Stratton is lauded as a genius until both management and the trade unions realise the consequence of his invention; once consumers have purchased enough cloth, demand will drop precipitously and put the textile industry out of business. The managers try to trick and bribe Stratton into signing away the rights to his invention but he refuses. Managers and workers each try to shut him away, but he escapes.

The bosses negotiate with Daphne, the daughter of the owner of Birnley Mills, that she will trick Stratton into giving it all up and she asks £5000 for this, but when she meets Stratton she has a change of heart and encourages him to announce his invention to the press. Going back to his rooms he is confronted by a woman who he thought was on his side, but suddenly realises that no-one wants his invention.

The climax sees Stratton running through the streets at night in his glowing white suit, pursued by both the managers and the employees. As the crowd advances, his suit begins to fall apart as the chemical structure of the fibre breaks down with time. The mob, realising the flaw in the process, rip pieces off his suit in triumph, until he is left standing in his shirt and underwear. Only Daphne Birnley, the mill-owner's daughter, and Bertha, a works labourer, have sympathy for his disappointment.

The next day, Stratton is dismissed from his job. Departing, he consults his chemistry notes. A realisation hits and he exclaims, "I see!" With that he strides off, perhaps to try again elsewhere.

Cast

Alec Guinness as Sidney Stratton
Joan Greenwood as Daphne Birnley
Cecil Parker as Alan Birnley
Michael Gough as Michael Corland
Ernest Thesiger as Sir John Kierlaw
Howard Marion-Crawford as Cranford
Henry Mollison as Hoskins
Vida Hope as Bertha
Patric Doonan as Frank
Duncan Lamont as Harry
Harold Goodwin as Wilkins
Colin Gordon as Hill
Joan Harben as Miss Johnson
Arthur Howard as Roberts
Roddy Hughes as Green
Stuart Latham as Harrison
Miles Malleson as the Tailor
Edie Martin as Mrs. Watson
Mandy Miller as Gladdie, little girl who sends a message for Stratton
Charlotte Mitchell as Mill Girl
Olaf Olsen as Knudsen
Desmond Roberts as Mannering
Ewan Roberts as Fotheringay
John Rudling as Wilson
Charles Saynor as Pete
Russell Waters as Davidson
Brian Worth as King
George Benson as the Lodger
Frank Atkinson as the Baker
Charles Cullum as 1st Company Director
F.B.J. Sharp as 2nd Company Director
Scott Harold as Express Reporter
Jack Howarth as Receptionist at Corland Mill
Jack McNaughton as Taxi Driver
Judith Furse as Nurse Gamage
Billy Russell as Nightwatchman

Sound 
The gurgling musical theme, "Guggle Glub Gurgle", that plays when Sidney Stratton’s apparatus is bubbling or when he is thinking about his invention is not made by musical instruments, but by laboratory equipment.

Reception
The film opened at the Odeon Marble Arch cinema in London on 10 August 1951, and was one of the most popular films of the year in Britain. It earned rentals of $460,000 in the United States and Canada. (This figure was also given as $500,000.)

The British Film Institute named it the 58th greatest British film of all time. In 2014 The Guardian included it as one of the twenty best British science fiction films.

Stage adaptation 
A stage play based on the film directed by Sean Foley and starring Stephen Mangan and Kara Tointon opened at the Theatre Royal, Bath in September 2019 before transferring to the Wyndham's Theatre in London's West End.

References

Further reading
 The Great British Films, pp. 153–155, Jerry Vermilye, 1978, Citadel Press,

External links 

1951 films
1950s satirical films
1950s science fiction comedy films
British satirical films
British science fiction comedy films
British black-and-white films
Films about labour
Films about fashion in the United Kingdom
Films set in Manchester
Ealing Studios films
Films directed by Alexander Mackendrick
Films produced by Michael Balcon
Films scored by Benjamin Frankel
1951 comedy films
1950s business films
Films shot in Greater Manchester
1950s English-language films
1950s British films